= MIR4761 =

Identifiers
- Aliases: MIR4761, microRNA 4761
- External IDs: GeneCards: MIR4761; OMA:MIR4761 - orthologs

Gene location (Human)
Chr.	Chromosome 22 (human)
Band	22q11.21	Start	19,963,753 bp
Band	22q11.21	End	19,963,834 bp
RNA expression pattern
Bgee	Human / Mouse (ortholog); Top expressed in: endometrium; blood; hippocampus proper; liver; caudate nucleus; gastrocnemius muscle; left ventricle; right lobe of liver; vagina; right auricle of heart / n/a; More reference expression data
BioGPS	n/a
Orthologs
Species	Human	Mouse
Entrez	100616414	n/a
Ensembl	ENSG00000284031	n/a
UniProt	n a	n/a
RefSeq (mRNA)	n/a	n/a
RefSeq (protein)	n/a	n/a
Location (UCSC)	Chr 22: 19.96 – 19.96 Mb	n/a
PubMed search		n/a
- Wikidata
View/Edit Human

MicroRNA 4761 is a microRNA that in humans is encoded by the MIR4761 gene.

== Function ==
microRNAs (miRNAs) are short (20-24 nt) non-coding RNAs that are involved in post-transcriptional regulation of gene expression in multicellular organisms by affecting both the stability and translation of mRNAs. miRNAs are transcribed by RNA polymerase II as part of capped and polyadenylated primary transcripts (pri-miRNAs) that can be either protein-coding or non-coding. The primary transcript is cleaved by the Drosha ribonuclease III enzyme to produce an approximately 70-nt stem-loop precursor miRNA (pre-miRNA), which is further cleaved by the cytoplasmic Dicer ribonuclease to generate the mature miRNA and antisense miRNA star (miRNA*) products. The mature miRNA is incorporated into a RNA-induced silencing complex (RISC), which recognizes target mRNAs through imperfect base pairing with the miRNA and most commonly results in translational inhibition or destabilization of the target mRNA. The RefSeq represents the predicted microRNA stem-loop.
